{{DISPLAYTITLE:C22H18O7}}
The molecular formula C22H18O7 (molar mass: 394.37 g/mol, exact mass: 394.1053 u) may refer to:

 Justicidin A
 MT81

Molecular formulas